Mark Keil and Dave Randall were the defending champions, but lost in the first round this year.

Jan Apell and Ken Flach won the title, defeating Alex O'Brien and Sandon Stolle 6–0, 6–4 in the final.

Seeds

  Sergio Casal /  Emilio Sánchez (quarterfinals)
  Jan Apell /  Ken Flach (champions)
  Javier Sánchez /  Mark Woodforde (first round)
  Mark Kratzmann /  Patrick Rafter (first round)

Draw

Draw

External links
 Main draw

Tennis Channel Open
1994 ATP Tour
1994 Tennis Channel Open